Middlesbrough Cricket Club plays at Acklam Park in Middlesbrough, North Yorkshire, England. The club currently plays in the North Yorkshire and South Durham Cricket League (NYSD).

It currently has multiple teams: 1st XI, 2nd XI, 3 XI, under 19, under 17, under 15, under 13, under 12, under 11, indoor and lions. The club also has a T20 team called Sirkars.

History
Established in 1855, the club opened Linthorpe Road as a purpose built cricket ground for the club in 1875. Middlesbrough Football Club (MFC) was founded by members of the club a year after the move. MFC began playing at the grounds in 1880 as joint tenants.

It was a founding member of the North Yorkshire and South Durham Cricket League (NYSD) in 1893. The club left Linthorpe Road the same year, leaving only MFC as its tenants.

After Linthorpe Road, the club moved to Breckon Hill Road (in the Grove Hill area of town) and further moved to Acklam Park in 1932. The Club became Acklam Park’s co-owners, with Middlesbrough RUFC as pre-existing tenets.

Honours
 1st XI has won the NYSD premier division 12 times; 1911, 1957, 1959, 1960, 1961, 1970, 1993, 1994, 2007, 2008, 2010 and 2022.

Notable players 
Brenton Parchment, 2003-4

References

External links
NYSD website
Cricket Yorkshire

English club cricket teams
Cricket in Yorkshire
Sport in Middlesbrough